De N103 is a regional road in the province Antwerp in Belgium. The total length of the road is about 7 kilometres.

References 

103